Uzbekistan time is the standard time in Uzbekistan; it is 5 hours ahead of UTC, UTC+05:00. The standard time uses no daylight saving time, though there has been constant debate whether to adopt it in order to increase leisure time.

After the breakup of the Soviet Union there were two time zones in Uzbekistan. In the Soviet era most time zones were daylight time in the winter and double daylight time in the summer. The western part of the country observed Samarkand Time 5 or 6 hours ahead of UTC. The eastern part observed Tashkent Time 6 or 7 hours ahead of UTC. In 1991 the clocks did not move forward in the spring to maintain single daylight time only in the summer. That fall a unified time zone was adopted 5 hours ahead of UTC.

See also
GMT
Time zone
UTC+05:00
Uzbekistan

References

 
Uzbekistan